Occhiuto is a surname. Notable people with the surname include:

Josephine Occhiuto, known as Joy Behar (born 1942), American comedian, television host, actress, and writer
Mario Occhiuto (born 1964), Italian politician and architect
Roberto Occhiuto (born 1969), Italian politician 
Pat Occhiuto (born 1957), Italian-American soccer player